Blow It Out is a jazz fusion album released in 1977 by Tom Scott.

Track listing
All tracks composed and arranged by Tom Scott except where indicated
"Gotcha" (Theme from Starsky & Hutch) – 3:30
"Smoothin' on Down" – 4:22
"Dream Lady" – 4:33
"I Wanna Be" (Richard Tee) – 4:49
"Shadows" – 7:40
"You've Got the Feel'n" – 5:06
"Down to Your Soul" (Scott, Dee Palmer) – 5:25
"It's So Beautiful to Be" (Ralph MacDonald, William Salter) – 5:36

Personnel
Tom Scott – saxophone, trumpet, Lyricon, woodwinds, vocals
Chuck Findley – trumpet
Dick Hyde – bass trumpet
Richard Tee – piano, clavinet, organ, Fender Rhodes
Kenny Ascher – clavinet
Dennis Budimir – guitar
Eric Gale – guitar
Hugh McCracken – guitar
Ray Parker Jr. – guitar
John Tropea – guitar
Gary King – bass
Chuck Rainey – bass
Steve Gadd – drums
Rick Marotta – drums, drum overdubs
Chris Parker – drums
Ralph MacDonald – percussion, congas

References

External links
Tom Scott official website

1977 albums
Ode Records albums
Tom Scott (saxophonist) albums